The Mysterines are a British alternative rock band from Liverpool and the Wirral comprising Lia Metcalfe (vocals and guitar), George Favager (bass guitar), Callum Thompson (guitar and backing vocals) and Paul Crilly (drums and backing vocals). Their debut album Reeling was released on 11th March 2022 via Fiction Records and charted at number 9 on the UK Albums Chart.

History
The band were formed by vocalist and writer Lia Metcalfe when she met bass player George Favager, both living near each other on the Wirral. The original line-up was a three piece with drummer Chrissy Moore. After Moore left in 2020 the band were augmented by Callum Thompson on guitar and backing vocals with Paul Crilly becoming the band's new drummer.

The band released a total of 6 songs across two EPs on their own Pretty Face Recordings label before signing to Fiction Records in March 2021. They released their debut album, Reeling, produced by Catherine Marks, almost exactly a year later.

References

English rock music groups
Fiction Records artists
Musical groups established in 2015
Musical groups from Liverpool